The 2007 Tokyo Gubernatorial elections were held on April 8, 2007 as part of the 16th unified local elections.  There were fourteen candidates, among them the incumbent governor Shintaro Ishihara. Most candidates, with the exception of Kurokawa and Yamaguchi, ran as independents, but some were supported by various parties.

Results

See also

References 

 Asahi News Editorial
 Trans-Pacific Radio coverage

External links 
 CityMayors coverage
 Video of candidate Koichi Toyama
 Discussion of 2007 Gubernatorial campaign
 Regular updates on 2007 Gubernatorial campaign and Japanese politics

2007 elections in Japan
Shintaro Ishihara
2007
April 2007 events in Japan
2007 in Tokyo